Phra Nang Klao Bridge station is a Bangkok MRT station on the Purple Line. The station opened on 6 August 2016 and is located on Rattanathibet road on the eastern end of Phra Nang Klao Bridge crossing the Chao Phraya River in Nonthaburi Province. The station has three entrances.

References 

MRT (Bangkok) stations